Ota (alternatively spelled Otta') is a town in Ogun State, Nigeria with an estimated 163,783 residents. Ota is the capital of the Ado–Odo/Ota Local Government Area.  The traditional leader of Ota is the Olota of Ota, Oba Adeyemi AbdulKabir Obalanlege. Historically, Ota is the capital of the Awori Yoruba tribe.

As of 1999, Ota has the third largest concentration of industries in Nigeria. It also possesses a large market and an important road junction, found just north of the tollgate on the Lagos – Abeokuta Expressway. Ota is well known because it is home to Obasanjo Farms Nigeria Limited belonging to the former Nigerian president, Olusegun Obasanjo. Ota is also the location of Canaanland which is the campus of the megachurch Winners' Chapel, as well as home to the Africa Leadership Forum.

Otta is known as the home of some Yoruba ancient deities and festivals.  Some  of the festivals usually celebrated in Otta includes Egungun festival, Iganmode Cultural Festival, Gelede Festival, etc.

History
 
OTA is a very ancient and foremost Awori kingdom whose existence dated back several millenniums ago. The town, no doubt, is acknowledged to be the first kingdom in the entire Awori land, a sub- Yoruba ethnic group, known as the Awori Kingdom Of "Ota" and equally ranks as one of the earliest or oldest kingdoms in  Yoruba land. As an enviable and great kingdom of note, it has very strong, sacred, and, of course, fortress traditions of origin, custom, culture, history and anthropology spiced with ethnological settlements and certified prudence spanning several centuries.

Also, the town, no doubt, is the ancestral root of many ancient towns or kingdoms within the present Ogun State and outside the state, such as; Lagos state, Oyo state, Osun state, nay, Nigeria, and sub-Saharan Africa. Thus, this historic milestone laced with ancient historical landmarks has been kept intact for thousands of years of both recorded and unrecorded history with verifiable claims succinctly supported by archeological studies and social anthropology. Of course, as an historical monumental entity, several kings (Traditional rulers) had reigned in this most ancient and revered kingdom before the 10th to 16th centuries.

HISTORICALLY,  OTA’S existence dates back to at least the period of  Orunmila (a contemporaneous with the Orunmila) as an established and organized human habitation or community with Obaship institution that no one could ascribe any specific date thus since the BC era. There were very few settlements then what is known as Yorubaland today. Apart from Ile-ife, the first place or source, OTA is a very, very ancient city ranking behind Ile-Ife only that ORUNMILA first visited. Other few places Orunmila visited after OTA for one reason or the other, were such towns as Ado-Ekiti, Irun Akoko, Ilawe and Ifon. No doubt, Orunmila visited Ota at least on three occasions as confirmed by Ifa-Irete Olota (Owonrin) Corpus and Odu Osa Meji (Odu Eleye).

The logical and sequential of traditions of Origin or  narrations are typically the exposition and originality of the history of Otta and its kingship institution which no part of Awori in the hinterland or upland and coast of West Africa can claim equal league of existence with variable ancient landmarks and reverting treasure trove to hold of global acceptance and recognition.

There had been Awori before Awori, and Ota stands the first long before arrival or emergence of Ogunfunminire and his Group between 15th and 17th centuries. Aworis are many, not all  the Aworis are children or descendants of Ogunfunminire or Olofin of Iseri Olofin. We had Olofins in Ota whose periods of migrations to Ota from Ife predated Iseri Olofin and others. The earliest Ota people set a fetish bowl according to Ifa divination on then river or stream, and sank on a river at Ota when others had not existed including Ogunfunminire, the progenitor of Isheri people but not the entire Aworiland because some Aworis denied vehemently the suggestion that their ancestors got to Isheri before moving to their present settlements.

Nonetheless, Aworis are culturally linked up despite the differences in their mode or waves of migratory movements to what is known as Aworiland, Apart from Ota, there are other Awori towns whose ancestors bear Olofin not of Isheri, such towns include; Iworo, Imeke, Ado-odo, etc.

Akin to the above historical cornerstone of OTA, John Thabiti Willis(2018) further adduced to the oral traditions known as IRETE OLOTA (OWONRIN) and Osa Meji in (Odu Eleye), IFA offers an alternative accounts of the originality and founding of Otta by the Terrestrial mothers commonly known as witches-Eleye or Iyami Osoronga; and have since domiciled OTTA from antiquity offering strong support for the fact that a human community or existence preceded the migrations to Otta by Ife Oodaye and other ife people. These traditions, however chronicle the historical journey of Orunmila to Ota, the revered settlement of the renowned witches, Ilu Aje (or Ilu Olori Eleye Osoronga), typically translated as the city of “Terrestrial mothers”.

Furthermore, to corroborate the above assertion on the traditions origin and founding of Otta, “The Archive of sound and vision, institute of African studies, University of Ibadan, the guiding and preservation of IRETE OLOTA (OWONRIN)

Needless to emphasize the obvious fact is that OTA is a very vibrant and flourishing kingdom in Yoruba land that gains/commands so much respect, honour, and recognition amongst her comparers.

This among other factors necessitated the awe and reverence with which OTA is held in the comity of nations and world tribes to date. It has become imperative to state here that each and every other traditional ruler (Olotas) have past historical antecedents which earned them a respectable position amongst the people of Yoruba land and beyond the shores of Yorubaland.

Historically, all the past traditional rulers of Ota (Olotas) were referred to as OLOFIN APESIN OLODE as symbols of spirituality, physical, and sovereignty. Without mincing words, the history, therefore, revitalize some insignificant and erroneous stories about the originality of kingship institution in OTA; and thus hitherto, provides clear, useful, and unambiguous history and bio-data of the traditional rulers of OTA from antiquity till date. For the avoidance of doubts or mist of error, it is, therefore, necessary we provide more reliable and authentic relics of the traditional rulers of OTA

The traditional institution in Ota dates back to the ife Oodaye period several millenniums ago as Orunmila, the great Ifa prophet met a woman named “IYARIGIMOKO” titled OLOTA ODO, OBA ARODEDEWOMI during his (Orunmila) visit to OTA at that material time. Thus, IYARIGIMOKO was the first OBA (Olota) in history which dated back to the BC era as confirmed by the ODU IFA ORUNMILA titled; IRETE OLOTA (OWONRIN) and OSA MEJI ELEYE. She was, however, succeeded by ATELE OLODE MERO, ERELU AFINJU OLOJA EKUN, otherwise Known as OLOTA ELEGBEJE OJA and OLOTA OLOFIN ARAOYE, a male ruler was the fourth OLOTA, whilst the traditional rulers reigned in OTA without any specific date.

There are other several Obas  (Traditional rulers) in Ota whose names and dynasties had been mowed down by the sickle of time; and/or, could not be remembered due to the mist of time but quite a few of them are still remembered see Olota of Ota.

(There is a popular saying in yoruba language thus " Oburu ju aje Ota lo"  meaning  more wicked than the Ota witch)

Ota today have grown from the ancient settlement founded by the Terrestrial mothers  commonly known as witches-Eleye or Iyami Osoronga into an Industrial City, a thriving Economic hub in Ogun state and Nigeria. Ota began to grow into the industrial city it is today due to the economic development planning and lobbying by the Manufacturers Association of Nigeria and Chief Bisi Onabanjo, former governor of Ogun State. This led to the official designation of Ota as an industrial town, and the state government began to encourage industries to locate in and around the city.

Education
Traditionally, Ota only had a few schools, and all were sponsored by various Christian religious organizations. The Muslim community responded by forming a school operated by the Ansar-Ud-Deen Society. State schools began to be formed in the late 1970s, and there are now several private schools in the area. Iganmode Grammar School is the oldest, founded in 1960. Other notable schools include Ansar-Ud-deen Comprehensive College, Bells Comprehensive Secondary School and Faith Academy Secondary School.

There are also two universities in Ota: Covenant University and Bells University of Technology. And a private polytechnic, Allover Central Polytechnic.

The Nigerian Navy's School of Music is also located in Ota.

Economy
Sections of the town are dominated by industries including Lagos - Abeokuta road and Idi-iroko road. Beginning in the early 1970s, many businesses began building factories in Ota partly because it was less congested than the industrial estates in Lagos. Businesses with facilities in Ota include:
 Farmex Meyer Limited 
 Nigerian Breweries 
 De United Foods Industries Limited
 Unique Pharmaceuticals 
 Intercontinental Distillers Limited.
 Honda Manufacturing (Nigeria),Ltd
 Veepee Industries Limited

Demographics 
The indigenes are predominantly Yoruba of the Awori dialect group. They trace their ancestry down from Ile-Ife and consider Iganmode as their patriarch. Other Aworis are located in the neighboring Lagos State.

The main occupation of Ota residents is trading and farming. The town's proximity to Lagos and proximity to the border town of Idiroko have led to the creation of two large markets: Kayero Market in Sango and Oba T.T. Dada Market along Idiroko Road. These markets are each so large that they blend together and are more commonly just referred to as Sango-Ota Market.

Tourist Attractions in Ota

Egungun Festival 

Ota is referred to as the mecca of Egungun deity and festival in Yoruba land. Egungun festival is part of the yoruba religious system sometimes referred to as orisa.  click on the link to see video below 

IGANMODE CULTURAL FESTIVAL 202I, THE MECCA OF EGUNGUN FESTIVAL IN OTA AWORI KINGDOM, OGUN STATE 

Egugun festival in ota is usually  ushered in ceremoniously, via a night before the d-day- tagged `Igbagan Day` meaning, a special night of blessing, through the invisible, sacred and dreaded legendary- animal, which visits the town in such an occasion with such a fierce but scintillating voice which several people (natives and non natives) alike stayed awake in the middle of the night to hear. It was such a delightful and fulfilling albeit a frightful experience to witness under lock and key in the corner of one`s room.  

This special creation emerged from the groove (Igbale) and retuned through it back to the forest having moved round the town in a speed of light..While the Agan is moving round the town,

its followers called “Omo Ariwo” meaning the “initiates” who are like tour guides but cannot see it, help respond to his supplications by saying “owo”. 

The implications of their responses was that may the festival be blessed with money and all sorts of prosperity.

The next day (Abode oko ) usually  witness a jamboree of egungun with well over 178 notable family masquerades that will dance around the town under the leadership of the Ege- which is the head of the egunguns; and finally converged at the Oju Sango beside Enu-Owa in the evening . At this arena, the entire masquerade gave an insight into their acquired new skills and magical performances that were later displayed one after the other in long but scintillating - carnival like environment.

Notable masquerades in otta numbering about 178 were classified into about 6 categories; in line with their functions and performances, namely: the Ege- which appeared to be the most beautiful, being the head of the masquerades came out in a well knitted expensive, colourful attire and covering it up with a highly decorated crown as a symbol of its authority. 

But before proceeding to the square, the Ege, accompanied by the Egungun Alagbadas, would head to Iga Elerinko to pick the sere abalaye (ancestral bell charm)which will be used  in making supplications for the city. Subsequently, it will return it and pick sere ide (decorative bell charm). With the sere ide, the Ege moves round the town along  with other Egungun and participants, singing and dancing to the Bata drum. 

It must be reiterated at this point that the Ege only comes out on this day. This is because it has performed its leading role at the commencement of the festival. This is closely followed by about 26 Alagbadas- whose appearance is also very expensive, fascinating and artistically colorful along with peculiar dancing steps  and a demonstration of some magical dexterity. They are: Ayoka- Ibile, Ariwoola, Afebioye, Ayelabola, Ibu- owo, Oya-Ogba, Ajofoyinbo (Iyesi), Owolafe, Ajofoyinbo (Ota), 

Obalolaye and Ayoka-Ese. Others are: Owolani, Eiyeba, Lebe- Oke, Labo- Ilawe, Lebe- Itimoko, Oya –Ijemo and Oya –Ikotun, 

all of which danced and performed satisfactorily in quick succession at the square (Okede).

Their individual performances attracted the high, the mighty and the low including  Governors of Ogun state, other government functionaries, industrialist and other fun seekers across the globe into the town.

There are 38 other special masquerades called Olooguns. These sets of masquerades outfits are not really attractive. In fact, they are scary with sculpted  artworks on their heads, but they are special in magical performances, thus cannot be easily ignored. There are also about 15, Baba-Mukomuko who are like prayer warriors and who also delivers messages from the dead to the living. The next in line are about 6 Alaredes- which specializes in dance and general entertainment of the people. 

The last on the list are the 14 Elebitis- which specializes in chants Ewi (praise singing) or poetic rendition to the amusement of all.

In all, it is always  a blissful experience to be in Ota during the festival and witness some of this wonderful performances and shows that could not be easily seen elsewhere aside Otta, 

which only happens every 3 or 4 years.

Iganmode Cultural Festival Iganmode Cultural Festival 

Iganmode Cultural festival (also known as Odun  Omo Iganmode) is an annual festival celebrated by the Awori Yoruba people of the ancient city of Ota in Ogun State, Nigeria.The week long annual festival usually takes place in Decemberof every year, to showcase the cultural, spiritual and mystical heritage of the Ota Awori people.The festival is also a spiritual bugle , a home coming call for a cultural renaissance and re awakening call to all sons and daughters of Awori sub-nationality, in Lagos, Ogun, Osun, Republic of Benin, diaspora and wherever they be may be on the face of earth.

History 
The first edition of the festival was held in 1992 when the festival was then referred to as Iganmode Day. over the years, the festival have hosted many prominent Nigerians and dignitaries, such as former Nigerian president Chief Olusegun Obasanjo, former Nigeria Attorney general and minister of justice the late Chief Bola Ige. others include former governors of Ogun State Chief Olusegun Osoba, Otunba Gbenga Daniel, Ibikunle Amosun and the present Governor and Deputy Governor Prince Dapo Abiodunand Engr. Noimot Salako Oyedele (a native of Ota). Taiwo Ajayi Lycett amongst others . The festival have also been chaired by a number of eminent personalities such as Asiwaju Bola  Tinubu, Sir Kesington Adebukunola Adebutu and Senator Musiliu Obanikoro

Key Highlights 
One of the major highlights of the festival is the display by Egungun Masquerades in OtaMasquerade traditions are very sacred to the awori yoruba people of Ota

Tourism 
The festival is been supported by the Ogun State Government. Tthe events of the festival are done with the spiritual and traditional blessings of the Olota of Ota. The festival also seek to promote the tourism potentials of Ota, Ogun State and Nigeria

It allows people to see different cultural displays and visits to tourist locations like the second storey building in Nigeria

https://www.youtube.com/watch?v=3UbKBDRDi5c

 Ota Traditional Chiefs

References

Populated places in Ogun State
Yoruba history
Towns in Yorubaland